David Rushe VC (28 April 1827 – 6 November 1886) was an English recipient of the Victoria Cross.

Details
Rushe was 30 years old, and a troop sergeant-major in the 9th Lancers (The Queen's Royal), British Army during the Indian Mutiny when the following deed took place for which he was awarded the VC:

Rushe received his Victoria Cross from Queen Victoria at Windsor Castle on 4 January 1860. This joined his medals for the 1st and 2nd Sikh Wars and the Indian Mutiny. He also received the Good Conduct Medal and the Long Service Medal.

Further information
He later achieved the rank of regimental sergeant-major. Rushe died on 6 November 1886 at Great Marlow and was buried without a stone at All Saints Church. His widow sold the medal, but his descendants re-purchased the medal in 1959 and later lent in to be displayed at his regimental museum within Derby Museum.

References

British recipients of the Victoria Cross
9th Queen's Royal Lancers soldiers
1827 births
1886 deaths
Indian Rebellion of 1857 recipients of the Victoria Cross
People from Woburn, Bedfordshire
British Army recipients of the Victoria Cross
Military personnel from Bedfordshire
Burials in Buckinghamshire